Milton Khondokar is a Bangladeshi film lyricist, music director and film director. He won Bangladesh National Film Award for Best Lyrics for the film Khodar Pore Ma (2012).

Selected films

Notable songs

Awards and nominations
National Film Awards

References

External links
 

1967 births
Living people
Bangladeshi lyricists
Best Lyricist National Film Award (Bangladesh) winners
People from Khulna
People from Kushtia District